Somali Lemonade was an American Thoroughbred racehorse.

The bay mare won the Grade I 2014 Diana Stakes.

Somali Lemonade had multiple Grade III stakes wins including the Jessamine Stakes and the Gallorette Handicap.

For a career total, the horse won 25% of its races (6 wins in 24 starts) and had nearly $1,000,000 in earnings. She died on January 23, 2016, of foaling complications.

References

2009 racehorse births
2016 racehorse deaths
Racehorses bred in Kentucky
Racehorses trained in the United States
Thoroughbred family 13-d
American Grade 1 Stakes winners